The Moto Guzzi Museum is a transport museum in Mandello del Lario, Italy.  The collection includes a number of important Moto Guzzi street motorcycles and motorcycle racing machines, as well as examples of rare engines like the Moto Guzzi V8. A section of the museum is devoted to historic Guzzi racer Bill Lomas.

Notes

References

External links

Moto Guzzi
Motorcycle museums in Italy
Museums in Lombardy
Mandello del Lario